Nathan Henry may refer to:

Nathan Henry (TV personality)
Nathan Henry (musician)

See also